Robert Spencer Redmond (10 September 1919 – 12 March 2006 ) was a British Conservative Party politician.

Redmond was Member of Parliament for Bolton West from 1970 to 1974.  In the second general election of that year, he lost the seat to future Labour minister Ann Taylor.

References 
Times Guide to the House of Commons October 1974

1919 births
2006 deaths
Conservative Party (UK) MPs for English constituencies
UK MPs 1970–1974
UK MPs 1974
Members of the Parliament of the United Kingdom for Bolton West